Andrés Carrasco (1946 in Buenos Aires – May 10, 2014) was an Argentine molecular biologist.

Career 
He was known for studying the effects of glyphosate used in Roundup on embryonic development. He was president and head scientist of the embryology laboratory (CONICET) of the University of Buenos Aires (UBA).

Death 
On 10 May 2014, Carrasco died in Buenos Aires from a heart attack, aged 67.

References

1946 births
2014 deaths
Argentine scientists
People from Buenos Aires
Argentine biologists
Molecular biologists